Suavecito may refer to 

 "Suavecito" (1929 song), written by Ignacio Piñeiro
 "Suavecito" (Malo song), released in 1972
 "Suavecito", a song by Laura León

See also 
 Suave (disambiguation)